His Dearest Possession is a 1919 British drama film directed by Henry Edwards and starring Edwards, Chrissie White and John MacAndrews. It was based on a story by E. Temple Thurston. The film follows an artist who falls in love with a woman and gives up painting in order to get a more secure job.

Cast
 Henry Edwards - Stephen Ayliff
 Chrissie White - Red Emma Lobb
 John MacAndrews - Herbert Lobb
 Esme Hubbard - Mrs Lobb
 Gwynne Herbert - The cottager
 Eric Barker - Charlie Lobb

References

External links

1919 films
British silent feature films
Films directed by Henry Edwards
1919 drama films
British drama films
Hepworth Pictures films
British black-and-white films
1910s English-language films
1910s British films
Silent drama films